Paromola cuvieri is a species of crab in the family Homolidae, the carrier crabs. It occurs in the eastern Atlantic Ocean and the Mediterranean Sea, from Angola to Norway, the Northern Isles and Iceland. It prefers areas with mud and emerging rocks, and has been observed in deep-water coral gardens and sponge aggregations. It is locally common.

This reddish crab is sexually dimorphic; the males have larger claws and are overall larger than the females. The carapace of the largest males can reach , while their claws can span . Like other members of the family, most P. cuvieri in their natural habitat carry an object, typically a living sessile invertebrate such as a sponge or deep-water coral, over the carapace in the small hindlegs. This may be used as camouflage, but is also used actively in defense by positioning the object between the crab and a would-be attacker. P. cuvieri is a scavenger of a wide range of animal matters, and a predator of animals such as decapods, but only rarely takes small benthic species (glycerids, cumaceans and amphipods).

References

Dromiacea
Crustaceans of the Atlantic Ocean
Crustaceans described in 1816